Fanni Kreiss (born 12 April 1989) is a Hungarian fencer. She competed in the women's foil event at the 2020 Summer Olympics in Tokyo, Japan.

References

External links 
 

Living people
1989 births
Place of birth missing (living people)
Hungarian female foil fencers
Fencers at the 2020 Summer Olympics
Olympic fencers of Hungary
21st-century Hungarian women